Kai Adan George (born 30 July 2002) is an English footballer who plays as a forward for  club Birmingham City.

George began his football career with West Bromwich Albion before joining Birmingham City's academy in 2015. He made his senior debut while on loan to Bromsgrove Sporting of the Southern League Division One Central in 2018–19, first played for Birmingham at the beginning of the 2020–21 season, and then spent time on loan at League Two club Walsall without making a first-team appearance.

Early life and youth career
George was born in Birmingham, where he attended Handsworth Grammar School. He was a member of West Bromwich Albion's academy before joining Birmingham City's in 2015. He took up a scholarship with the club in July 2018. According to coach Steve Spooner, he "is very quick, very powerful and needs to recognise that is his strength. It's about using his strengths and imposing himself on the opponents. But he is capable of scoring goals. He is very direct. He has to work on the technical side of the game, like a lot of the boys." The player agreed that his pace and power were his best qualities, and felt he needed to improve his composure and dribbling.

He was one of a number of Birmingham youth players who spent a few weeks on loan at non-league clubs in late 2018. He joined Bromsgrove Sporting of the Southern League Division One Central, and made one senior appearance, as a second-half substitute in a 3–0 defeat away to Coleshill Town on 1 January 2019, before returning to his parent club. Although his season was interrupted by injury, he scored eight goals from five matches for Birmingham's under-18s, and played for their under-23 team that reached the final of its division, in which they finished as runners-up in the 2018–19 Professional Development League Northern Section but lost out to Leeds United on penalties for the overall title. His performances attracted attention from Premier League clubs, and his goalscoring in Birmingham's 2019–20 FA Youth Cup run, combined with his not having signed a professional contract, meant interest heightened. By April 2020, when the club made him an offer of professional terms, Spooner described him as having "a physique like a middleweight boxer and you get him running in the channels against you, when he uses his strength as well as his pace, then he causes a problem."

Club career
In July 2020, George signed a two-year contract with Birmingham City, with an option for a third year. He made his first-team debut in the opening match of Birmingham's 2020–21 season, playing the whole of the 1–0 defeat at home to Cambridge United in the EFL Cup. The Birmingham Mail thought he "showed some impressive hold up play and strength with his back to goal but didn't have much joy when he got turned" in what was a promising debut. He made his first appearance in the Football League a week later, as a second-half substitute in the opening match of the Championship season.

That was his last appearance before joining League Two club Walsall on 16 October on loan until 3 January 2021. He was among the substitutes for two league and two cup matches, but remained unused. George spent the rest of the season with Birmingham's under-23 team, again helping them achieve runners-up spot in the Professional Development League Northern Section and going on to score both goals in a 2–0 win against Sheffield United U23 to secure the overall title.

George tore his ACL during pre-season, had surgery in September 2021, and missed the entire season as a result. With his contract due to expire, the club offered him a 12-month deal with the option of another year, which he signed.

Career statistics

References

2002 births
Living people
Footballers from Birmingham, West Midlands
English footballers
Association football forwards
West Bromwich Albion F.C. players
Birmingham City F.C. players
Bromsgrove Sporting F.C. players
Walsall F.C. players
Southern Football League players
English Football League players
People educated at Handsworth Grammar School
Black British sportspeople